Les Villettes is a commune in the Haute-Loire department in south-central France.

Geography
The Lignon du Velay forms the commune's southwestern border.

Politics and administration

List of mayors

Population

See also
Communes of the Haute-Loire department

References

Communes of Haute-Loire